A Member of Parliament or Member of the National Assembly of Pakistan (abbreviated: MNA or MP) is a legislative constituency's representative in the National Assembly of Pakistan (Urdu: ایوانِ زیریں پاکستان‬), the Pakistan Parliament's lower house. On the basis of adult suffrage, National Assembly members are chosen through direct elections. The National Assembly of Pakistan is only allowed to have 342 total members of parliament or MNA. This includes 70 seats set aside for women and religious minorities from across Pakistan, and 272 members are directly elected through the election.

Eligibility criteria 
The following requirements must be met in order for someone to be eligible to join the National Assembly of Pakistan;

 Must be a citizen of Pakistan.
 Must not be less than 25 years of age.
 Must not be convicted by the court.
 Adequate knowledge of Islamic teachings.
 Must be a sound person.
 Must be sadiq (truthful) and ameen (trustworthy).
 Worked for the nation's integrity and ideology of Pakistan.
 Must be a voter for any parliamentary constituency in Pakistan.

Disqualification grounds 

A person wouldn't be qualified to serve as a member of Pakistan's National Assembly if he/she;

 Has an unsound mind.
 Is insolvent.
 Has ceased to be a citizen of Pakistan.
 Is so disqualified by any law made by the Pakistani parliament.
 Is so disqualified on the ground of defection.
 Has been convicted, among other things, for promoting enmity between different groups.
 Has been convicted for the offence of bribery.
 Has been convicted for an offence and sentenced to imprisonment of more than two years.
 Has been dismissed for corruption or for disloyalty to the state (in the case of a government servant).

Term 
A member of the National Assembly of Pakistan has a five-year tenure beginning on the day of their appointment.

Responsibilities 
The responsibilities of the members of the National Assembly of Pakistan are;

 Legislative: To make necessary legislation.
 Oversight: to ensure that the executive performs its duties satisfactorily.
 Representation: to speak for the opinions and desires of their constituents in the Pakistani Parliament.
 Power of the purse: to approve and control the government's proposed budgetary income and expenditures.

Salary, allowances, and entitlements 
Pakistan pays a lump sum including other allowances of Rs.188000 to the member of the National Assembly of Pakistan per month according to the 1974 Act. If the MNA has some extra designations, then the National Assembly pays extra allowances.

Number of constituencies 
Here is a list of how many National Assembly seats there were in each election year starting in 1954.

See also 
 Member of the Provincial Assembly
 List of members of the 15th National Assembly of Pakistan
 Constitution of Pakistan
 Parliament of Pakistan

References 

 
 
Pakistan
Parliament of Pakistan